The Yadav Singh corruption case is an alleged event of corruption in the Indian state of Uttar Pradesh. Yadav Singh was the Engineer-in-Chief of the Noida Authority, Greater Noida Industrial Development Authority (GNIDA) and Yamuna Expressway Industrial Development Authority (YEIDA). Raids conducted by the Income Tax Department in November 2014 at several locations, including his residence in Sector-51 Noida, showed that Singh owned property disproportionate to his known sources of income.

He was suspended by the Government of Uttar Pradesh and in February 2015 a one-member judicial commission to probe into the multi-crore case was set up the state government. On a Public Interest Petition filed by activist and advocate Nutan Thakur, in July 2015 Allahabad High Court directed the Central Bureau of Investigation (CBI) to investigate the case stating that the allegations were most serious and the probe was complex. 

The Uttar Pradesh government went to the Supreme Court of India against the High Court's order in Nutan Thakur's PIL, however the Supreme Court refused to entertain the government's plea.
 
Earlier in March 2012, Singh was suspended and a first information report (FIR) filed against him in a Rs 954 Crore (Rs 9.54 billion) properties scam. In February 2020 Singh was again arrested by the CBI.

Yadav Singh 
Yadav Singh started his career as a Junior Engineer (JE). He is a diploma holder in electrical engineering and has no formal degree in engineering which is must for gazetted officers. Singh was promoted to the post of Assistant Project Engineer (Assistant Engineer level) in 1985 without the requisite engineering degree. Singh was once again elevated in 1995 to the post of Project Engineer (Executive Engineer level) when he did not have an engineering degree.

Family
Yadav Singh is married to Kusum Lata, who was also named and alleged to be involved in his corruption case.

References

Corruption in Uttar Pradesh
2015 in India
Crime in Noida